Jeffrey Dennis Sadow (born June 24, 1962) is an associate professor of political science at Louisiana State University in Shreveport known for his Internet writings on behalf of political conservatism and the Republican Party in Louisiana.

Academic background
Sadow holds degrees from the University of Oklahoma at Norman, Oklahoma, Vanderbilt University in Nashville, Tennessee, and the University of New Orleans.

After a stint at the University of Illinois at Springfield, he joined the LSUS faculty in Shreveport in 1991.

Political writings
On October 21, 1995, Sadow ran for a Shreveport seat on the Caddo Parish Commission. Sadow lost to another Republican, John P. Escude, 4,697 votes (56.4 percent) to 3,628 (43.6 percent).

In 2009, Chris Cillizza of The Washington Post'''s "The Fix" blog described Sadow's blog as "one of the best state political blogs in the nation." Sadow has been particularly critical of Democrats, such as former President Barack Obama, former Senator Mary Landrieu, her brother, former Lieutenant Governor and former mayor of New Orleans Mitch Landrieu. Sadow said that Mitch Landrieu "promotes partisanship over policy" and seeks to undermine the Jindal administration.

Sadow supported the reelection of Senator David Vitter in 2010 and Vitter's unsuccessful gubernatorial candidacy in 2015. He has often defended the administration of Republican former Governor Bobby Jindal, although has been critical of Jindal on matters such as education reform, corporate welfare, and spending.

Accessing Sadow's work
 
Sadow's work is currently found on the following:
 
FAXNet Update (http://www.faxnetupdate.com), BayouBuzz (http://www.bayoubuzz.com), and PoliticsLa (http://www.politicsla.com). His work also is syndicated in a few Louisiana newspapers such as the Houma Courier (http://www.houmacourier.com).

His daily commentary on Louisiana and local politics is available at http://www.between-lines.com . Sadow's periodic reports on the Louisiana State Legislature may be accessed at http://www.laleglog.com.

His academic work may be found in several journals. Most recently and most relevant to Louisiana politics was a contribution to the online political science journal The Forum'' concerning the factors behind the 2003 governor's contest.

References

1962 births
Educators from Louisiana
Journalists from Louisiana
American political scientists
Louisiana Republicans
University of Oklahoma alumni
Vanderbilt University alumni
University of New Orleans alumni
People from Bossier City, Louisiana
University of Illinois at Springfield faculty
Louisiana State University Shreveport faculty
Living people
American columnists
American radio personalities